Chalice is a defunct Britain vanity record label created by Coil, exclusively for albums put out by the group. Its brother labels are Threshold House and Eskaton.

According to the 2006 re-pressings of Musick to Play in the Dark Vol. 1 and 2, Chalice is stationed in Thailand as Peter Christopherson supervised the repressing in Krung Thep, where he lived.

Releases

See also 
 List of record labels
 List of electronic music record labels

External links
 Threshold House

Electronic music record labels
Vanity record labels
Defunct record labels of the United Kingdom
Experimental music record labels